The 131st Pennsylvania House of Representatives District is located in Southeastern Pennsylvania and has been represented since 2020 by Milou Mackenzie

District profile
The 131st Pennsylvania House of Representatives District is located within  Lehigh County, Montgomery County and Northampton County. It includes Dillingersville Union School and Church and Red Hill Historic District. It is made up of the following areas:
 Lehigh County
 Coopersburg
 Lower Milford Township
 Salisbury Township (PART, Ward 03 [PART, Division 01])
 Upper Milford Township 
 Upper Saucon Township
 Montgomery County
 East Greenville
 Green Lane
 Pennsburg
 Red Hill
 Marlborough Township
 Salford Township
 Upper Hanover Township
 Northampton County 
 Lower Saucon Township (PART, Districts 01, 02, 04, 07 and 08)

Representatives

Recent election results

References

External links
District map from the United States Census Bureau
Pennsylvania House Legislative District Maps from the Pennsylvania Redistricting Commission.  
Population Data for District 131 from the Pennsylvania Redistricting Commission.

Government of Lehigh County, Pennsylvania
Government of Montgomery County, Pennsylvania
Government of Northampton County, Pennsylvania
131